The specific inhalation challenge (SIC) is a diagnosis tool to assess airway responsiveness to "sensitizing" substances as opposed to nonspecific stimuli such as pharmacological agents (i.e. histamine, methacholine), cold air and exercise. Subjects are exposed to a suspected occupational agent in a controlled way under close supervision in a hospital laboratory. The specific inhalation challenges has been considered as the gold standard in confirming the diagnosis of occupational asthma.

Methods 
One of the steps of SIC is to perform a challenge with the suspected asthmagen. Then, FEV1 is subsequently measured using another device and compared to a baseline.
A positive response is usually a decrease in baseline FEV1 of 15 to 20 percent.

Realistic method 
The realistic method was developed in the 1970s. The patient enters a sealed chamber and is exposed to the suspected agent in a controlled, non-work, test environment. The asthmagen can be water-soluble and nebulized. If the agent is non-soluble, the patient tips the agent from one tray to another in an attempt to mimic the work environment. This method has the advantage of being able to assess, albeit highly subjectively,	ocular and nasal symptoms as well as a reduction in FEV1.

There are, however, disadvantages to the method. First, SIC is currently only conducted in specialty facilities because the facilities and equipment are rare and expensive. Second, the realistic method may exposed the patient to huge concentrations of particles, resulting in unduly severe asthma attacks. Alternately, the agent can be delivered using the recently developed closed-circuit technique.

Closed-circuit method  
This test requires the patient to breathe aerosols of the suspected agent (asthmagen) through an oro-facial mask or mouth piece. These asthmagens are aerosolized using closed-circuit chambers, and the quantities and concentrations administered being minute and extremely stable minimize the risk of exaggerated responses.

See also 
Occupational asthma

References

Asthma
Occupational safety and health